Westchase is a census-designated place (CDP) in Hillsborough County, Florida, United States. The population was 21,747 at the 2010 census, up from 11,116 at the 2000 census. The census area encompasses most of the 33626 ZIP code area.

Description 
Westchase is located halfway between Tampa and Palm Harbor. Its boundaries include Oldsmar to the west, Keystone to the north, Town 'n' Country to the south, and Citrus Park to the east. Westchase Golf Course is a major recreational amenity for the community. Tampa Bay Downs, a horse racetrack, is located on the area's western edge.

History 
Westchase was founded and constructed on April 15, 1991 with the approval of the Hillsborough County commissioners, and the area went on new development on September 15, 1991.

Geography
It is bordered to the west by Pinellas County.

Demographics

As of the census of 2010, there were 21,747 people living in the community.  The population density was 2,203 people per square mile.  The racial makeup of the community was 82.5% White, 5.3% African American, 0.2% Native American, 6.6% Asian, 0.01% Pacific Islander, and 3% from two or more races. Hispanic or Latino of any race were 15.5% of the population.

There were 9,244 households in Westchase.  The average household size was 2.55.

The median income for a household in the community was $88,964.  The median home value was $326,200.

Community association

The Westchase Community Association is the largest deed-restricted community (homeowner association) within the Westchase census-designated place. The community is organized into 28 neighborhoods, or villages. Some of these villages are organized into even smaller subsections. Each of these villages and their "sub-villages" are represented by a voting member and at least one alternate who are elected annually by the residents of a particular neighborhood. Some of the villages also have a website that is maintained by a "village webmaster". Residents are encouraged to participate by attending website committee meetings or providing material to help improve the website to the webmaster.

Community development districts

Westchase was established with two Community Development Districts (CDDs). CDDs are statutorily created governmental entities charged with the task of maintaining the common areas of planned communities. In September 2011, the two CDDs agreed to merge. The state approved the merger and it became effective October 1, 2011.

The villages

Abbotsford
Arlington Park
Bennington
Berkeley Square
Brentford
The Bridges
Castleford
Chelmsford
Classic Townhomes of West Park Village 
Enclave
The Fords
Glencliff
Glenfield
The Greens
Harbor Links/Estates
Keswick Forest
Kingsford
Radcliffe
Saville Rowe
The Shires
West Park Village-Single Family Homes
Reserve at West Park Village
Stamford
Townhomes of West Park Village
Traditional Townhomes of West Park Village
Village Green
Villas of West Park Village
Vineyards 
Woodbay
Worthington
Wycliff
Windsor Place

West Park Village

West Park Village, with two town centers, is a walkable mixed-use area in Westchase with shops, bars, restaurants and village greens, as well as condos, townhomes, houses, and apartments with varied resident ages. Some of the most highly rated bars in the Tampa area are located here. West Park Village has a distinct look which was inspired by historic Hyde Park in South Tampa. The area has a summer concert series, nightly specials at the different village restaurants, and an annual pub crawl.. Westchase ranked as the 26th coolest suburb in the United States worth a visit by Travel + Leisure magazine.

See also
Carrollwood (CDP), Florida
Hyde Park (Tampa)
New Tampa
Tampa Palms

References

External links
 Westchase Community Association
 World of Westchase, news site

Census-designated places in Hillsborough County, Florida
Populated places established in 1991
Census-designated places in Florida
Planned communities in Florida
1991 establishments in Florida